International Emergency Nursing is a peer-reviewed nursing journal covering emergency healthcare. It is published quarterly by Elsevier and is an official publication of the European Society of Emergency Nurses and the Faculty of Emergency Nursing. It was established in 1993 as Accident and Emergency Nursing and obtained its current title in 2008. The current editor-in-chief is Heather McClelland.

References

External links 

Emergency nursing journals
Elsevier academic journals
English-language journals
Quarterly journals
Publications established in 1993